Union Mall is a shopping mall in the north of Bangkok, at the Lat Phrao junction. The mall opened in February 2006. It houses some 1,240 booths and shops and entertainment services.

See also
List of shopping malls in Bangkok
List of shopping malls in Thailand
List of largest shopping malls in Thailand

References

Shopping malls in Bangkok
Chatuchak district
Shopping malls established in 2006
Thai companies established in 2006